The Yamaha SA2200 is a Japanese made semi-hollowbody electric guitar model that replicates Gibson's ES-335 classic save for the popular Far Eastern variation of thinner horns. The detailing more closely resembles the more upmarket ES-347 with gold-plated hardware, split block inlaid ebony fretboard and multi-bound body and headstock detailing.

The headstock angle is slightly flatter than the classic 17-degree angle used by Gibson, with Yamaha choosing to retain the volute to help strengthen the area behind the nut. The finger board uses medium gauge (2.54mm x 1.2mm) frets, which unlike the Gibson, extend over the single edge binding.

Pickups
The standard Gibson-style wiring is augmented by Yamaha's push-push tone pot switches which knock out the outer coils of each Alnico V humbucker allowing for combinations of humbucking to single-coil use. The coil-taps produce a Strat-style mix with both pickups on, while the neck single-coil alone provides a thinner, more acoustic like version of the plummy humbucker mode.

Notable SA2200 Users
 Butch Walker 
 Greg Dawson
 Frank Gambale
 Lukasz Gottwald (Dr. Luke)
 Primož Grašić
 Biréli Lagrène
 Miles Okazaki
 John Scofield
 Torsten de Winkel

References

 "The Guitar Magazine" UK, Vol 6 No 8. 1996. Review.

External links
Product page at Yamaha UK

Semi-acoustic guitars
SA2200